Warren Roger Whiteley (born 18 September 1987) is a South African former professional rugby union player for the  in Super Rugby, the  in the Currie Cup and the  in the Rugby Challenge. His regular playing position was eighthman.

Whiteley has been the captain of the Lions in Super Rugby since 2014 when they team was re-introduced to the competition. The team has reached two finals in 2016 and 2017, which were losses against the Hurricanes and Crusaders respectively, since Whiteley was named captain.

In 2016 Whiteley became a regular starter for the Springoks following injury to the regular number 8 Duane Vermeulen in the second test against Ireland. Following Vermeulen's injury, Whiteley played the full 80 minutes of every game for the rest of the year, with the exception of the Barbarians fixture on 5 November, which Whiteley did not play in. Whiteley also scored three tries that year, crossing over the line against Argentina, Australia and Ireland,

Whiteley was named the new 58th captain of the Springboks in 2017, following Adriaan Strauss' retirement from international rugby. Whiteley was ruled out of the final mid-year test against France due to injury however, being replaced as captain by Stormers lock Eben Etzebeth. Whiteley missed the Super Rugby playoffs due to injury, with Jaco Kriel taking over as captain of the Lions. He went on to miss the entirety of the remaining 2017 season.

He returned in the opening match of the 2018 Super Rugby tournament for the Lions against the Sharks. However, he sustained an injury against the Blues and missed the majority of the Super Rugby season as well as the mid-year internationals, a match against Wales and a three-match series against England. Siya Kolisi took over captaincy in the absence of Whiteley and Etzebeth and kept his captaincy beyond the return of the two players.

Whiteley would go on to lead the Lions to the final of the 2018 Super Rugby tournament, a 37-18 loss to the Crusaders, the third consecutive time that the Lions were runners-up in the tournament. Whiteley started every game for South Africa in the 2018 Rugby Championship including a 34-36 victory against New Zealand at Westpac Stadium. The Springboks came second in the championship.

References

External links 
 
Lions profile
itsrugby.co.uk profile
ultimaterugby.com blitzbokke

1987 births
Living people
Commonwealth Games gold medallists for South Africa
Commonwealth Games medallists in rugby sevens
Commonwealth Games rugby sevens players of South Africa
Expatriate rugby union players in Japan
Golden Lions players
Lions (United Rugby Championship) players
North-West University alumni
NTT DoCoMo Red Hurricanes Osaka players
Rugby sevens players at the 2014 Commonwealth Games
Rugby union number eights
Rugby union players from Durban
Sharks (Currie Cup) players
South Africa international rugby sevens players
South Africa international rugby union players
South African expatriate rugby union players
South African expatriate sportspeople in Japan
South African people of English descent
South African rugby union players
White South African people
Medallists at the 2014 Commonwealth Games